Nobert Michel is the Vice President and Director of the Cato Institute's Center for Monetary and Financial Alternatives, where he specializes on issues pertaining to financial markets and monetary policy. Michel was most recently the Director for Data Analysis at the Heritage Foundation where he edited, and contributed chapters to the books The Case Against Dodd–Frank: How the “Consumer Protection” Law Endangers Americans, and Prosperity Unleashed: Smarter Financial Regulation. Michel is also a regular for Forbes, the Daily Signal,

Michel was previously as a professor at Nicholls State University’s College of Business.

Education 
Bachelor of Business Administration, Finance and Economics, Loyola University. Ph.D., Financial Economics, University of New Orleans.

Publications

Policy reports 
 Michel, Norbert and Burton, David (2016). "Financial Policy in a Free Society." Heritage Report.

Scholarly articles 
 Michel, Norbert (2018). "Special Interest Politics Could Save Cash or Kill It." Cato Journal.
 Michel, Norbert (2015). "A Roadmap to Monetary Policy Reforms." Cato Journal.
 Michel, Norbert (2014). "Dodd-Frank's Expansion of Fed Power: A Historical Perspective." Cato Journal.

References 

Cato Institute people
Nicholls State University faculty
Living people
Year of birth missing (living people)